Psychic Warfare is the eleventh studio album by the band Clutch, It was released on October 2, 2015 through the band's own label Weathermaker Music.

Album Info 
Psychic Warfare has been released on: CD, Black & White, Newbury Comics Exclusive 500 Autographed Copy Limited Edition, Transparent Red, & UK Blue Vinyl, "Mad Sidewinder b/w Outland Special Clearance," a Record Store Day 12" 5000 Copy Limited Edition Vinyl Record, as well as a  Digital-Only Deluxe Edition with bonus tracks.

Psychic Warfare was produced and mixed by "Machine" (aka Gene Freeman) who also worked with the band on previous albums: Pure Rock Fury, Blast Tyrant and Earth Rocker.

The album-package features photography and artwork by Dan Winters who has been collaborating with Clutch since their 1993 debut album Transnational Speedway League.

Commercial performance
Psychic Warfare debuted at No. 1 on the Top Rock Albums Chart and No. 11 on Billboard 200-- selling 26,000 copies in the first week.  This is the best chart-ranking achieved on both charts by the band as well as their best weekly sales.

Track listing 
All music written by Clutch except "Your Love is Incarceration" written by Clutch & Eugene Freeman (aka Machine) & "We Need Some Money" written by Chuck Brown & Curtis Johnson. All lyrics by Neil Fallon.

Original release

Digital deluxe edition 
Track 13-15 are bonus tracks on the deluxe edition.

Personnel 
Clutch
 Neil Fallon – vocals, rhythm guitar
 Tim Sult – lead guitar
 Dan Maines – bass
 Jean-Paul Gaster – drums

Technical personnel
 Machine – production, engineering & mixing
 Alberto De Icaza & Jeff Henson – engineering 
 Paul Logus – mastering 
 Dan Winters – art 
 Andrew Massiatte Lopez – design

Charts

References

Clutch (band) albums
2015 albums